Mali is a 2018 Croatian drama film directed by Antonio Nuić. It was selected as the Croatian entry for the Best International Feature Film at the 92nd Academy Awards, but it was not nominated.

Plot
Frenki, a drug dealer recently released from prison, battles for custody of his son.

Cast
 Vito Dijak as Mali
 Franjo Dijak as Frenki
 Hrvoje Kečkeš as Keco
 Bojan Navojec as Boki
 Rakan Rushaidat as Goc
 Živko Anočić as Majić

See also
 List of submissions to the 92nd Academy Awards for Best International Feature Film
 List of Croatian submissions for the Academy Award for Best International Feature Film

References

External links
 

2018 films
2018 drama films
Croatian drama films
2010s Croatian-language films